The 1999 SummerSlam was the 12th annual SummerSlam professional wrestling pay-per-view (PPV) event produced by the World Wrestling Federation (WWF, now WWE). It took place on August 22, 1999, at the Target Center in Minneapolis, Minnesota. Nine matches were contested at the event.

Production

Background
SummerSlam is an annual pay-per-view (PPV), produced every summer by the World Wrestling Federation (WWF, now WWE) since 1988. Dubbed "The Biggest Party of the Summer," it is one of the promotion's original four pay-per-views, along with WrestleMania, Royal Rumble, and Survivor Series, and was considered one of the "Big Five" PPVs, along with King of the Ring. It has since become considered WWF's second biggest event of the year behind WrestleMania. The 1999 event was the 12th event in the SummerSlam chronology and was scheduled to be held on August 22, 1999, at the Target Center in Minneapolis, Minnesota.

Storylines

The main feud heading into SummerSlam was between Stone Cold Steve Austin, Triple H and Mankind over the WWF Championship. The previous month at Fully Loaded, Austin retained the WWF Championship by defeating The Undertaker in a first blood match when X-Pac interfered, allowing Austin to hit Undertaker with a television camera. Also at Fully Loaded, Triple H defeated The Rock in a Strap match to become the number one contender for the WWF Championship, thanks to the help of Billy Gunn and Chyna. In recent weeks, Triple H stated that he's been studying Austin for months to figure out how to beat him.

On the August 9th episode of Raw is War, it was revealed that Minnesota governor as well as fellow WWF legend Jesse "The Body" Ventura would be the special guest referee for the main event at SummerSlam. When Triple H came out and got in Ventura's face, WWF Commissioner Shawn Michaels set up a match between Austin, Triple H and Undertaker. When Austin was found mysteriously attacked in a stairwell, Michaels accused Triple H of being the attacker but Triple H denied it. Michaels then set up a Triple threat match with the title of number one contender on the line between Triple H, Undertaker and Chyna. Austin returned later that night and hit Triple H with a chair, then put Chyna on top allowing her to win the match and become number one contender.

The following week, Triple H challenged Chyna to a match with her number one contender status on the line which Chyna accepted. Chyna again won the match after Mankind returned from a knee injury and attacked Triple H. Mankind then challenged Chyna for her number one contender status but Chyna refused to accept and low blowed Mankind, Michaels overruled Chyna and made the match. Mankind later defeated Chyna when Triple H attempted to interfere. Shane McMahon stated as owner of the WWF he was booking a match between Mankind and Triple H to determine the undisputed number one contender. Michaels agreed to the match and he and Shane named themselves as referees. When Mankind and Triple H covered each other, Michaels and Shane both counted to three but they argued over who is the number one contender. Ring announcer Tony Chimel announced that both men are winners and that there will be a Triple threat match at SummerSlam.

Another rivalry heading into SummerSlam was between Test and Shane McMahon. In July before Fully Loaded, Shane and the Mean Street Posse had started a feud with Test because of his relationship with Stephanie McMahon whom Shane feels was dating "beneath the family standards". Over the following weeks, Test had faced Posse member Joey Abs whom Shane had set up on a date with Stephanie. On the July 12 episode of Raw is War, Test wrestled the Posse in a Gauntlet match but it ended in no contest when Shane interfered. When the Posse attempted to break Test's ankle, Stephanie came out and grabbed her brother from behind. Thinking that it was a referee, Shane backhand elbowed his sister and knocked her out. The following two weeks, Stephanie rejected Joey Abs and demanded that her brother and his friends stay out of her life. On the August 15 episode of Sunday Night Heat, Shane challenged Test to a "Love her or Leave her" Greenwich Street Fight at SummerSlam. If Shane won Test and Stephanie could no longer see each other but if Test won Shane would give his blessing to them. Test agreed and accepted the challenge.

The third rivalry heading into SummerSlam was between the teams of X-Pac and Kane against The Undertaker and Big Show for the WWF Tag Team Championship. After X-Pac interfered in Undertaker's first blood match with Stone Cold Steve Austin at Fully Loaded, Undertaker blamed X-Pac for costing him the WWF Championship and attacked him the next night on Raw is War. Kane came to his partner's rescue and brawled with his brother until Big Show (whom Kane lost to at Fully Loaded) ran out to the ring and joined Undertaker in putting a beating on both of them. Then Undertaker and Big Show shook hands and formed an alliance. Two weeks later, Kane and X-Pac defeated the Acolytes to win the WWF Tag Team Championship. Road Dogg came out to celebrate with them however all three were attacked by Big Show and Undertaker leading to a Tag Team Championship match between the two teams at SummerSlam.

Reception
In 2014, Dylan Diot of 411Mania gave the event a rating of 7.5 [Good], stating, "This is one of the more underrated editions of SummerSlam. [I] was pleasantly surprised by just how much I enjoyed the show. The wrestling was consistent with plenty of good performances across the board. That Shane McMahon/Test match is sensational and it should have helped launch Test as a major star and it showed that Shane McMahon is actually a capable in ring performer. They kept the overbooking, swerves, and nonsensical booking to a minimum and it resulted in exciting matches and a great atmosphere. Go out of your way to check this out, it really is an underrated gem of a show."

Results

Tag team turmoil

Notes

References

onlineworldofwrestling.com - SummerSlam '99 results
twnpnews.com - SummerSlam
hoffco-inc.com - SummerSlam '99 review

External links
Official 1999 SummerSlam site

1999
1999 in Minnesota
Events in Minneapolis
Professional wrestling in Minneapolis
1999 WWF pay-per-view events
August 1999 events in the United States